Bryan Taylor (frequently spelled Brian Taylor, born July 23, 1975) is a retired American soccer midfielder who played professionally in the USISL and Major League Soccer.

Youth
Taylor played collegiate soccer at Fresno State in 1994 and 1995.

Professional
In 1996, Taylor played for the Central Coast Roadrunners.  He scored five of the team's six playoff goals.  On February 2, 1997, the Los Angeles Galaxy selected Taylor in the first round (ninth overall) of the 1997 MLS Supplemental Draft.  On November 6, 1997, the Miami Fusion selected Taylor with the 24th selection of the 1997 MLS Expansion Draft.  He played six games for the Fusion before being waived on June 1, 1998, in order to make room on the roster for Matt Knowles.  He then joined the Charleston Battery for the rest of the season.

References

External links
 

1975 births
Living people
American soccer players
Central Coast Roadrunners players
Charleston Battery players
Fresno State Bulldogs men's soccer players
LA Galaxy players
Major League Soccer players
Miami Fusion players
Stanislaus County Cruisers players
San Francisco Seals (soccer) players
USL League Two players
A-League (1995–2004) players
LA Galaxy draft picks
Soccer players from California
People from Hanford, California
Association football midfielders
Association football forwards